Prospect is a borough in Butler County, Pennsylvania, United States. As of the 2010 census, the borough had a population of 1,169.

Geography
Prospect is located in western Butler County at  (40.904113, -80.046430). U.S. Route 422, a limited-access highway, cuts across the northeastern corner of the borough, leading east  to Butler, the county seat, and west  to New Castle. Moraine State Park, a recreation destination surrounding Lake Arthur, is next to the northwestern border of the borough.

Demographics

As of the census of 2000, there were 1,234 people, 501 households, and 359 families residing in the borough. The population density was 258.4 people per square mile (99.7/km2). There were 518 housing units at an average density of 108.5 per square mile (41.8/km2). The racial makeup of the borough was 99.35% White, 0.08% Native American, 0.08% Pacific Islander, and 0.49% from two or more races. Hispanic or Latino of any race were 0.41% of the population.

There were 501 households, out of which 34.5% had children under the age of 18 living with them, 58.3% were married couples living together, 10.0% had a female householder with no husband present, and 28.3% were non-families. 24.2% of all households were made up of individuals, and 9.4% had someone living alone who was 65 years of age or older. The average household size was 2.46 and the average family size was 2.92.

In the borough the population was spread out, with 24.2% under the age of 18, 8.0% from 18 to 24, 31.0% from 25 to 44, 24.1% from 45 to 64, and 12.6% who were 65 years of age or older. The median age was 38 years. For every 100 females there were 100.3 males. For every 100 females age 18 and over, there were 96.8 males.

The median income for a household in the borough was $33,452, and the median income for a family was $40,417. Males had a median income of $33,125 versus $21,298 for females. The per capita income for the borough was $17,435. About 6.1% of families and 8.1% of the population were below the poverty line, including 12.2% of those under age 18 and 7.2% of those age 65 or over.

Notable people
Rube Waddell, early 20th century baseball Hall of Fame left-handed pitcher who spent his teen years in Prospect
Arda Green, biochemist, was born at Prospect in 1899

References

External links

Borough of Prospect official website

Populated places established in 1825
Boroughs in Butler County, Pennsylvania